How Sweet It Is to Be Loved by You is the fifth studio album released by American singer and songwriter Marvin Gaye, released in 1965. The album features the successful title track, which at the time was his best-selling single and was famously covered by James Taylor in 1975. Other hits include "Try It Baby" (which features The Temptations) and "Baby Don't You Do It" (with backing vocals provided by The Andantes).
Inspired by Jackie Gleason’s trademark expression.

Track listing

Side one
 "You're a Wonderful One" (Holland-Dozier-Holland) - 2:45
 "How Sweet It Is (To Be Loved by You)" (Holland-Dozier-Holland) - 2:58
 "Try It Baby" (Berry Gordy, Jr.) - 2:51
 "Baby Don't You Do It" (Holland-Dozier-Holland) - 2:38
 "Need Your Lovin' (Want You Back)" (Marvin Gaye, Clarence Paul) - 2:15
 "One of These Days" (William "Mickey" Stevenson) - 3:00

Side two
 "No Good Without You" (William "Mickey" Stevenson) - 2:43
 "Stepping Closer to Your Heart" (Marvin Gaye, Harvey Fuqua) - 2:43
 "Need Somebody" (Ivy Hunter, William "Mickey" Stevenson) - 2:51
 "Me and My Lonely Room" (Barrett Strong, Norman Whitfield) - 2:52
 "Now That You've Won Me" (Smokey Robinson) - 2:40
 "Forever" (Lamont Dozier, Brian Holland, Freddie Gorman) - 2:20

Personnel
 Marvin Gaye – lead vocals
 The Spinners – backing vocals (side 1, tracks 5 and 6; side 2, tracks 1–4)
 The Andantes – backing vocals (side 1, tracks 2, 4, and 6; side 2, tracks 4 and 6)
 The Supremes – backing vocals (side 1, track 1)
 The Temptations – backing vocals (side 1, track 3)
 Martha and the Vandellas – backing vocals (side 2, track 5)
 The Funk Brothers – instrumentation 
 Maurice Davis – trumpet solo (side 1, track 3)
 Marcus Belgrave – trumpet (side 1, track 1)
 Russell Conway – trumpet (side 1, track 1)
 Paul Riser – trombone (side 1, track 1)
 Patrick Lanier – trombone (side 1, track 1) 
 Henry Cosby – tenor saxophone (side 1, track 1)
 Mike Terry – baritone saxophone (side 1, tracks 1, 2 and 4) 
 George Fowler – organ (side 1, tracks 1 and 2)
 Johnny Griffith – piano (side 1, track 1)
 Earl Van Dyke – piano (side 1, track 2) 
 Clarence Isabell – bass (side 1, track 1)
 James Jamerson – bass (side 1, track 2) 
 Benny Benjamin – drums (side 1, track 1)
 Richard "Pistol" Allen – drums (side 1, track 2)
 Eddie Willis – guitar (side 1, track 1)
 Robert White – guitar (side 1, track 2)
 Jack Ashford – tambourine (side 1, tracks 1 and 2)

References

1965 albums
Marvin Gaye albums
Tamla Records albums
Albums produced by Brian Holland
Albums produced by Lamont Dozier
Albums recorded at Hitsville U.S.A.
Albums produced by Berry Gordy